Volodymyr Fedorovych Lozynskyi (6 January 1955 – 17 July 2020) was a Soviet and Ukrainian football player and coach.

Honours
 Soviet Top League winner: 1977, 1980, 1981.
 Soviet Cup winner: 1978, 1982.

International career
Lozynskyi made his debut for USSR on October 14, 1979 in a friendly against Romania. He played in the 1982 FIFA World Cup qualifiers, but was not selected for the final tournament squad. He also played in one UEFA Euro 1984 qualifier.

In 1979 Lozynskyi played a couple of games for Ukraine at the Spartakiad of the Peoples of the USSR.

References

External links
  Profile
 
 

1955 births
2020 deaths
Sportspeople from Bryansk Oblast
Soviet footballers
Ukrainian footballers
Soviet Union international footballers
Association football defenders
FC Dynamo Kyiv players
FC Metalist Kharkiv players
SKA Kiev players
FC Kryvbas Kryvyi Rih players
FC Kremin Kremenchuk players
Soviet Top League players
Soviet Second League players
Ukrainian Amateur Football Championship players
Soviet football managers
Ukrainian football managers
FC Kremin Kremenchuk managers
FC CSKA Kyiv managers
Ukraine student football team managers
FC Vorskla Poltava managers
Soviet Second League managers
Ukrainian Premier League managers
Ukrainian First League managers
Ukrainian Second League managers
Burials at Baikove Cemetery